The national park system of Kenya is maintained by the Kenya Wildlife Service. There are two main types of terrestrial protected areas in Kenya: national parks, and national reserves; there are also marine parks and marine reserves.

National parks

 Aberdare National Park
 Amboseli National Park
 Arabuko Sokoke National Park
 Central Island National Park
 Chyulu Hills National Park
 Hell's Gate National Park
 Kisite-Mpunguti Marine National Park
 Kora National Park
 Lake Nakuru National Park
 Malindi Marine National Park
 Malka Mari National Park
 Masai Mara National Park
 Meru National Park
 Mombasa Marine Park
 Mount Elgon National Park
 Mount Kenya National Park
 Mount Longonot National Park
 Nairobi National Park
 Ol Donyo Sabuk National Park
 Ruma National Park
 Saiwa Swamp National Park
 Sibiloi National Park
 Tsavo East National Park 
 Tsavo West National Park
 Watamu Marine National Park

National reserves 
 Arawale National Reserve
 Bisanadi National Reserve
 Boni National Reserve
 Buffalo Springs National Reserve
 Dodori National Reserve
 Kakamega Forest National Reserve 
 Kisumu Impala Sanctuary
 Lake Bogoria National Reserve
 Masai Mara National Reserve
 Mwaluganje elephant sanctuary
 Mwea National Reserve
 Mwingi National Reserve
 Rahole National Reserve
 Rimoi National Reserve
 Samburu National Reserve
 Shimba Hills National Reserve
 Tana River Primate Reserve
 Witu Forest Reserve (Utwani Forest Reserve)

Marine parks and reserves
 Kisite-Mpunguti Marine National Park
 Kiunga Marine National Reserve 
 Malindi Marine National Park
 Mombasa Marine National Park and Reserve
 Tana River Primate National Reserve
 Watamu Marine National Park

See also
List of national parks in Africa
Tourism in Kenya

References

External links

Kenya Wildlife Service
Kenya Tourism Board - official travel and tourism guide
 Safari Park

National parks
Kenya

National parks